BBC Local Video (originally Local TV) was a pilot project operating in the West Midlands region serving Birmingham, the Black Country, Coventry & Warwickshire, Staffordshire, Shropshire and Hereford & Worcester, England.

Teams of video journalists at six centres (sharing local radio offices) began broadcasts on digital satellite television (accessed via the BBC Red Button from any BBC channel on page 1700) and via the BBC's local websites on 1 December 2005. The service ran as a 9-month trial until the Summer of 2006.

The BBC Trust and regulator Ofcom reviewed the trial and undertook research into potential effects the service may have on competition, in particular the impact on newspaper sales. Criticism came from the Conservative Party and a section of the local newspaper industry as an unfair encroachment on established commercial interests in local media.

The Trust ruled in November 2008 that the service would not be value for money and called instead for more improvements to be made to the existing programming.

References

Local Video
BBC New Media
Satellite television
West Midlands (county)
Mass media in Birmingham, West Midlands
Mass media in Warwickshire
Mass media in Staffordshire
Mass media in Shropshire
Mass media in Herefordshire
Mass media in Worcestershire
regional
Internet properties established in 2005
Internet properties disestablished in 2006
Defunct BBC television channels
Television channels and stations established in 2005
Television channels and stations disestablished in 2006
2005 establishments in England
2006 disestablishments in England